Agonum thoreyi is a species of ground beetle native to Europe.

References 

thoreyi
Beetles described in 1828
Beetles of Europe
Taxa named by Pierre François Marie Auguste Dejean